The Battle of Shujabad took place on February 1780.The Afghans were led by Muzaffar Khan and Timur Shah Durrani, while the Sikhs were led by Jassa Singh Ahluwalia, and several other Sikh chiefs.

Background
Early in January 1780, Timur Shah Durrani laid siege to Multan. Though the Sikhs were smaller in number, Timur Shah believed his resources were not enough, and as a result, dispatched a small force to Bahawalpur while leaving the majority of his force at Multan. The Nawab of Bahwalpur gave tribute to Timur Shah and supplied him with 12,000 men as reinforcements. News also came that Jassa Singh, Gujar Singh, Haqiqat Singh, Lahna Singh, and Bhanga Singh alongside several other Sikh chiefs were arriving from Lahore with an army of 15,000 to relieve the city of Multan.

Battle
Muzaffar Khan left Bahawalpur and met the Sikh force at Shujabad, where a battle was fought on 8 February 1780. During the battle, a dust storm flew, and Muzaffar Khan captured a Sikh drummer. Muzaffar Khan spared the drummers life on the condition that he would beat the drum to bring the Sikhs into battle, as Muzaffar Khan planned a trap. The Sikh drummer began beating the drum and the Sikh forces who had heard it rushed into the dust storm,although facing poor visibility. Muzaffar Khan arranged his forces into two straight columns, which was arranged in such a way that when a Sikh force was encountered ,one would grab him, and the other would kill him. This continued until the Sikhs lost thousands of men from the trap, which forced the Sikhs to retreat to Lahore. The Sikhs were defeated and suffered between 700 to 2,000 casualties. The Sikh force fled to Lahore and Timur Shah dispatched a force of 20,000 men in pursuit of them. The force overtook the Sikhs at Hujra Muqim Khan, 40 miles west of Lahore and successfully defeated them before returning to Multan.

Aftermath
Following this, the Afghans would reorganize at Multan and take it in the Siege of Multan (1780). Muzaffar Khan would become governor of Multan following its capture by the Afghans.

References

See also 

 Siege of Multan (1780)
 Timur Shah Durrani
 Indian campaign of Ahmad Shah Durrani

Battles involving the Sikhs